The Women's time trial of the 2012 Dutch National Time Trial Championships cycling event took place on 20 June 2012 in and around Emmen, Netherlands. The first women started at 17:00. The course was 22.65 km.

The time trial started in Dierenpark Emmen, the zoo of Emmen, besides the African savanna. It was the first time in history a cycle race started in a zoo. Riders rode along the zebras, giraffes, rhinos and hippos.

Ellen van Dijk became for the second time in her career Dutch national time trial Champion. She won also the title in 2007. Van Dijk finished 14 seconds ahead of Annemiek van Vleuten (Rabobank) and 67 seconds of Iris Slappendel (Rabobank).

Results

Final classification

*Age at the day of the competition.

Results from uci.ch and knwu.nl

Starting order

Startlist from knwu.nl.

References

External links

Dutch National Time Trial Championships
2012 in women's road cycling